Charles Francis Keeney Jr. (March 15, 1882 – May 22, 1970) was a union organizer during the West Virginia Coal Wars. He served as a rank-and-file leader during the Paint Creek-Cabin Creek strike of 1912–13 and became president of United Mine Workers District 17 from his election in 1916 until 1924. He played a leadership role during the strike of 1920–21 leading up to the Battle of Blair Mountain.

References 

1882 births
1970 deaths
United Mine Workers people
Trade unionists from West Virginia